
Year 202 BC was a year of the pre-Julian Roman calendar. At the time it was known as the Year of the Consulship of Geminus and Nero (or, less frequently, year 552 Ab urbe condita). The denomination 202 BC for this year has been used since the early medieval period, when the Anno Domini calendar era became the prevalent method in Europe for naming years.

Events 
 By place 

 Carthage 
 Accused of treason by the Carthaginians after being defeated by the Romans at the Battle of the Great Plains, Hasdrubal Gisco commits suicide to avoid being lynched by a Carthaginian mob.
 October 19 – The Battle of Zama (130 kilometers south-west of Carthage) ends the Second Punic War and largely destroys the power of Carthage. Roman and Numidian forces under the leadership of the Roman general Publius Cornelius Scipio and his Numidian ally, Masinissa, defeat a combined army of Carthaginians and their Numidian allies under the command of Hannibal and force Carthage to capitulate. Hannibal loses 20,000 men in the defeat, but he is able to escape Masinissa's pursuit.

 Roman Republic 
 Following the Battle of Zama, the Roman general Publius Cornelius Scipio gains the cognomen "Africanus" in honour of his feats in North Africa against Carthage.

 Egypt 
 The Egyptian regent and chief minister, Sosibius, retires and Agathocles, another member of the ruling clique, becomes Ptolemy V's guardian.
Agathocles rule provokes Tlepolemus, the governor of Pelusium (Egypt's eastern frontier city), into action. Tlepolemus marches on Alexandria, where his supporters rouse a mob, compelling Agathocles to resign.
 The Egyptian boy king, Ptolemy V, is encouraged by a mob clamouring for revenge against the murderers of his mother Arsinoe III to agree to Agathocles being killed. As a result, the mob searches out and butchers Agathocles and his family. Tlepolemus takes Agathocles' place as regent. However, he soon proves to be incompetent and is removed.
 During this period of confusion and change amongst Egypt’s leadership, armies under the Seleucid king, Antiochus III, make serious inroads into the Egyptian territories in Coele-Syria.

 China 
 Liu Bang and Han Xin defeat the remaining loyalists of Xiang Yu.
 28 February: Liu Bang declares himself Supreme Emperor of China, officially beginning the Han dynasty.
 Liu Bang appoints Han Xin the king of Chu, but he deposes him later in the year after accusing him of disloyalty.
 The construction of the new Chinese capital Chang'an begins.
 Liu Bang gives the area of today's Fujian province to Wuzhu as his kingdom. Wuzhu starts the construction of his own capital Ye (Fuzhou).
 The construction of Changsha begins.
 The armies of Han, led by Fan Kuai, suppress a rebellion by the State of Yan, defeating its king Zang Tu.

Deaths 
 Hasdrubal Gisco, Carthaginian general who has fought against Rome in Iberia and North Africa during the Second Punic War, customarily identified as the son of Gisco (suicide)
 Xiang Yu, rebel leader against the Qin dynasty and nemesis of Liu Bang in the Chu–Han Contention (b. 232 BC)

References